Seoul National University of Science and Technology (abbreviated SeoulTech) is a national university located in Nowon-gu, Seoul, South Korea.

Seoul National University of Science and Technology originated from Public Eoeudong Vocational Continuing School. Later the school was re-organized as Gyeongseong Public Industrial School, Gyeonggi Technical College, and Seoul National University of Technology before it was finally reborn as Seoul National University of Science and Technology in September 2010 to celebrate the 100th anniversary of its foundation. The institution is also known as 'Seoultech'.

Today Seoultech is a large and general university housing six colleges, 23 departments, seven graduate schools and a student enrolment of 11,500 people in a spacious campus of 508,690 square meters (124 acres). This is the fifth-largest campus in the universities of Seoul. The campus, formerly occupied by the colleges of engineering of Seoul National University, is in Nowon-gu in the northern part of Seoul. Seoul National University of Science and Technology was ranked second in South Korea and 23rd in Asia in field of focused university in the 2015 by Quacquarelli Symonds (QS)
and ranked 15th in South Korea in the field of Science and Engineering in 2015 by Korea Economic Daily (한국경제신문).

Departments
College of Engineering
 Department of Mechanical System and Design Engineering
 Mechanical Design and Automation Engineering Program
 Mechanical Design and Manufacturing Engineering Program
 Department of Mechanical & Automotive Engineering
 Mechanical Engineering Program
 Automotive Engineering Program
 Department of Safety Engineering
 Department of Materials Science & Engineering
 Department of Civil Engineering
 School of Architecture
 Architecture Program
 Architectural Engineering Program

College of Information and Communication Engineering
 Department of Electrical and Information Engineering
 Department of Electronic and IT Media Engineering
 Electronic Engineering Program
 Media IT Engineering Program
 Department of Computer Science and Engineering

College of Energy and Biotechnology
 Department of Chemical and Biomolecular Engineering
 Department of Environmental Engineering 
 Environmental Engineering Program
 Environmental Policy Program
 Department of Food Science and Technology
 Department of Fine Chemistry
 Department of Optometry
 Department of Sports Science

College of Art and Design
 Department of Design
 Visual Communication Design Program
 Industrial Design Program
 Department of Ceramic Arts and Design
 Department of Metal arts & Design
 Department of Fine Arts

College of Humanities and Social Sciences
 Department of English Language and Literature
 Department of Science of Public Administration
 Major in Science of Public Administration
 Major in Environmental Public Administration
 Department of Creative Writing

College of Business and Technology
 Department of Industrial and Systems Engineering
 Major in Industrial and Information Systems Engineering
 Major in Manufacturing Systems and Design Engineering (MSDE)
 Major in IT Management (ITM)
 Department of Business Administration
 Major in Business Administration
 Major in Global Technology Management (GTM)

There are also three professional graduate schools and three special graduate schools within the university. Aside from these, there are a number of specialist research institutes.

Graduate school
 Master's Course, 2 years (4 semesters)
 Doctor's Course, 2 years (4 semesters)
 Engineering 
Department of Mechanical Design and Robot Engineering
Department of Mechanical Engineering
Department of Safety Engineering
Department of Product Design and Manufacturing Engineering
Department of Data Science
Department of Materials Science & Engineering
Department of Automotive Engineering
Department of Civil Engineering
Department of Architectural
Department of Electrical and Information Engineering
Department of Electronic Engineering
Department of Computer Science and Engineering
Department of Media IT Engineering
Department of Chemical Engineering
Department of Environmental Engineering
Department of Food Science and Technology
Convergence Institute of Biomedical Engineering and Biomaterials
Department of Interdisciplinary Bio IT Materials

 Science 
Department of Fine Chemistry
Department of Optometry

 Art and Physical 
Department of Industrial Design
Department of Visual Design
Department of Ceramic Art
Department of Metal Arts & Design
Department of Fine Arts
Department of Sports Science

 Humanities and Social Science
Department of Business Administration
Department of English Language and Literature
Department of Creative Writing

Professional Graduate School
 Master's Course, 2 years (4 semesters)
 Doctor's Course, two and a half years (5 semesters)
 Combined Master's and Doctorate program, 4 years (8 semesters)
 Graduate School of Railway
Department of Railway Management & Policy
Department of Railway Construction
Department of Electric & Signaling Engineering
Department of Rolling Stock System
Department of Railway System

 Graduate School of Public Policy and Information Technology
Department of Public Policy
Department of Industrial & Information Systems
Department of Broadcasting and Communication Policy
Department of Digital & Cultural Policy

 Graduate School of Energy and Environment
Department of New Energy Engineering
Department of Environmental Energy Engineering
Department of Energy System Engineering
Department of Energy Safety Engineering
Department of Energy Policy

 Graduate School of Nano IT Design Fusion
Nano IT Fusion Program
Broadcasting Communication Fusion Program
IT Design Fusion Program

Special graduate schools
 Master's Course,  years (five semesters), at night
 Graduate School of Industry
Convergence Program of Healthcare & Biomedical Engineering
Disaster Safety & Fire Protection Program
Management of Technology Program
Global Project Management Program
Manufacturing Technology Convergence Program
Department of Food Science and Technology
Department of Civil Engineering
Department of Architectural Design
Department of Metal Art & Design
 Graduate School of Housing
Department of Housing Environment and Service Technology
Department of Housing Construction Engineering
Department of Housing Planning and Design
Department of Housing Management
Department of Housing Development and Management

Library
The library at Seoul National University of Science and Technology has been operational since the foundation of Eoeudong Public Vocational Continuing School in April 1910. Today, the Library has 600,987 volumes, 11,928 e-books, 23,259 audiovisual materials, and 446 periodicals and academic journals published domestically and abroad.

The Central Library building, completed at the end of 2004, consists of three stories with an area of 9,281 m2 (2,807 pyeong). The first floor houses the library office, seminar rooms, Western archive, and information processing center. The second floor is occupied with Eastern archives and references, periodicals, and an academic journal room. The third floor houses a multimedia room, group study room, and reading room. The annex to Central Library, remodelled in 2011, is a building with an area of 4,896.25 m2 (1,400 pyeong) that is equipped with a reference room, reference room for western books, room for study groups, notebook computer reading room and general reading room. The library has collected academic research works of the professors and the students for the past 100 years.

Other support facilities

Aside from the library there is also an Information and Computer Center; a Press and Broadcasting Center; a General Laboratory Building; a Business Incubation Center; an Educational Equipment Management & Technical Support Center; and an International Office/ Centre for International Exchange. Finally, there is an Institute for Language Education and Research staffed by twenty native-speaking English instructors.

Scholarships

About half of the student body benefit from a scholarship program which offers education at a comparatively low cost. In 2015, about 6,000 of 11,500 students benefited from scholarship. The school's current tuition only amounts to 40% of an average private university's costs and 80% of tuition fees charged by other national universities. In 2014, 47% of tuition was reused for scholarships. Seoultech also has a number of funded international cooperation programs, and two joint degree programs with Northumbria University in the United Kingdom.

The Institute for Language Education and Research
The Institute for Language Education and Research (ILER) provides a variety of language programs to serve the university's English, Korean, Chinese and Japanese learning needs. There are currently 26 full-time faculty positions. The ILER has a dedicated language center building which houses all needed facilities: professors' offices, administration offices, conference hall, conversation classrooms with round tables, etc. The ILER is a developing PLC (Professional Learning Community), focused on modernizing curriculum, expanding opportunities for research and publication, and fostering a spirit of intercultural exchange.

Symbols 
In March 2014, the university's Public Relations Office held its first Symbolic Committee to determine its symbolism. Following the first questionnaire for teachers and faculty members in April 2013, we conducted a second questionnaire involving 12,807 undergraduate and graduate students in June 2013 in order to enact the symbol of university. The second questionnaire for undergraduate and graduate students who answered 91% of the total enrollment was Daesanbang, Sycamore, and Symbolic Animals. Haitai won the most votes.

Rankings 
In 2021, Seoul National University of Science and Technology ranked 51-100 globally in Petroleum Engineering field and 401-450 globally in Electrical and Electronic Engineering based on QS Subject Ranking.

History

 9 November 2015 – Inauguration of Jong-Ho Kim as 11th president
 1 March 2012 – Seoul National University of Science and Technology, Technology University to Broad General University transition
 25 October 2011 – Inauguration of Keun NamKoong as tenth president
 1 September 2010 – Changed university name From Seoul National University of Technology to Seoul National University of Science & Technology 
 1 September 2010 – Completion of Centennial (100-year) Memorial Sculpture construction
 1 February 2010 – Completion of Frontier hall construction
 3 December 2009 – Completion of the construction of Centennial(100-year) Memorial Hall (start of the construction, 3 April 2007)
 1 March 2008 – Opening of Graduate School of NID Fusion Technology
 1 March 2008 – Completion of Seoul Techno Park(STP) construction
 1 January 2008 – Completion of Student Dormitory III construction
 17 October 2007 – Inauguration of Jun-Hyong Roh as ninth president
 1 October 2007 – Completion of Language Center construction
 1 August 2007 – Completion of Student Dormitory II construction
 1 June 2006 – Completion of Mirae Hall construction
 1 September 2005 – Designation authorization of Seoul Technopark
 25 February 2005 – Completion of Student Library II construction
 17 December 2004 – Establishment authorization of Seoul Technopark Nonprofit Corporation
 23 September 2004 – Foundation of Seoul Technopolis Promotion Center and Center for Engineering Education
 26 March 2004 – Inauguration of Dr. Jin-Shin Yoon as eighth president
 27 September 2003 – Establishment of SNUT Industry-Academic Alliance Corporation
 23 September 2003 – Establishment authorization of Graduate School of Energy & Environment
 21 April 2003 – Inauguration of Dr. Hee-Beom Lee as seventh president
 1 March 2003 – Establishment of Graduate School of Public Policy & Information Technology
 1 March 2002 – Change of Graduate School of Railroad Technology to Graduate School of Railroad (PhD Course)
 24 February 2001 – Foundation of Graduate School of Housing
 1 March 2000 – Foundation of Graduate School of Railroad Technology
 1 March 2000 – Foundation of Department of English, Department of Creative Writing and Department of Social Sports Science (Daytime)
 Establishment a dual bachelor's dual program in collaboration with Northumbria University in the UK
 1 April 1999 – Inauguration of Dr. Jin-Seol Lee as sixth president
 2 April 1998 – Opening of Foreign Language Education Center
 1 April 1998 – Opening of Laboratory Center
 6 October 1995 – Foundation of Materials Science and Engineering, Graduate School of Industry & Engineering
 1 April 1995 – Inauguration of Dr. Dong-Gyu Choi as fifth president
 3 September 1994 – Foundation of Computer Science and Engineering, Graduate School of Industry & Engineering
 1 March 1994 – Foundation of Department of Creative Writing and Department of Social Sports Science
 1 March 1993 – Foundation of Design and Automobile Engineering and Automatic Chemical Engineering, Graduate School of Industry & Engineering
 24 February 1993 – Renamed Seoul National University of Technology in accordance with the revision of national school establishment decree (Presidential Decree No. 13895, February 24, 1993)
 24 November 1992 – Foundation of Industry Craft, Graduate School of Industry & Engineering.  Completion of Dormitory construction
 1 March 1992 – Foundation of Department of Industry Administration and Department of Fine Chemistry Foundation of School of Engineering III, School of Engineering IV and School of Humanities, Social and Natural Sciences
 21 March 1991 – Inauguration of Prof. Dae-Byeong Yoon as fourth president
 1 March 1990 – Foundation of School of Engineering I, School of Engineering II, School of Art & Design, and Department of Applied Fine Arts
 15 November 1989 – Foundation of Electric Engineering, Chemical Engineering and Mechanical Design and Automation Engineering, Graduate School of Industry & Engineering
 1 March 1988 – Renamed Seoul National Industrial University (Presidential Decree No. 1407, February 24, 1988)
 21 March 1987 – Inauguration of Dr. Dong-Hee Lee as third president
 29 February 1984 – Foundation of Department of Environmental Engineering, Department of Industrial Safety Engineering, and Department of Mould Design
 30 March 1983 – Inauguration of Dr. Ho-Keun Kim as second president
 31 December 1982 – Closing of Gyunggi Technical College in accordance with the revision of national school establishment decree
 March 1979 – Inauguration of Dr. Soon-Cheol Hong as first dean
 March 1974 – Renamed Gyunggi Technical College
 March 1963 – Renamed Gyunggi Technical High Special School
 March 1953 – Renamed Gyunggi Technical High School
 March 1944 – Reorganized into Gyunggi Public Technical School
 March 1931 – Reorganized into Gyungsung Public Vocational School
 15 April 1910 – Public Eoeudong Vocational Continuing School

See also
List of national universities in South Korea
List of universities and colleges in South Korea
Education in Korea

References

External links

 Official web site (English)
 Official web site (Korean)

Nowon District
Universities and colleges in Seoul
National universities and colleges in South Korea
Educational institutions established in 1910
1910 establishments in Korea